General Young may refer to:

David Young (British Army officer) (1926–2000), British Army lieutenant general
David G. Young III (fl. 1960s–2000s),  U.S. Air Force brigadier general
Frederick Young (East India Company officer) (1786–1874), British East India Company Army generals
James Young (British Army officer) (1858–1926), British Army major general
Peter Young (British Army officer, born 1912) (1912–1976), British Army major general
Pierce M. B. Young (1836–1896), Confederate States Army major general
Richard Whitehead Young (1858–1919), U.S. Army brigadier general
Robert Young (soldier) (1877–1953), New Zealand Military Forces major general
Robert Nicholas Young (1900–1964), U.S. Army lieutenant general
Samuel Baldwin Marks Young (1840–1924), U.S. Army lieutenant general
Thomas L. Young (1832–1888), Union Army post-war brevetted brigadier general
William Hugh Young (1838–1901), Confederate States Army brigadier general

See also
Attorney General Young (disambiguation)